Van Kesteren is a Dutch toponymic surname meaning "from Kesteren"", Gelderland.  Notable people with the surname include:

Anne van Kesteren (born 1986), Dutch web standards expert
Dave Van Kesteren (born 1955), Canadian Conservative politician
Hans van Kesteren (1908–1998), Dutch football defender
Jeanne Van Kesteren (1907–?), Belgian javelin thrower
John van Kesteren (1921–2008), Dutch opera singer
Ton van Kesteren (born 1954), Dutch PVV politician

References

Dutch-language surnames
Surnames of Dutch origin
Toponymic surnames